Tazehabad (also Romanized as Tāzehābād) is a village in Harasam Rural District, Homeyl District, Eslamabad-e Gharb County, Kermanshah Province, Iran. At the 2006 census, its population was 176, in 38 families.

References 

Populated places in Eslamabad-e Gharb County